Warren Christopher McClendon (born April 11, 2001) is an American football offensive tackle for the Georgia Bulldogs.

Early life and high school
McClendon grew up in Brunswick, Georgia and attended Brunswick High School. He was rated a four-star recruit and committed to play college football at Georgia.

College career
McClendon played during his true freshman season before redshirting the year. As a redshirt freshman, he started nine of Georgia's ten games and was named a Freshman All-American by the Football Writers Association of America. McClendon started all 15 of Georgia's games at right tackle as the Bulldogs won the 2022 College Football Playoff National Championship. He was named first team All-Southeastern Conference as a redshirt junior. McClendon suffered a knee injury in the 2022 SEC Championship Game and missed the 2022 Peach Bowl.

Personal life
McClendon's uncle, Willie McClendon, played running back at Georgia and in the NFL for the Chicago Bears. His cousin, Bryan McClendon, also played at Georgia and for the Bears and is currently the Bulldogs' passing game coordinator and wide receivers coach.

References

External links
Georgia Bulldogs bio

Living people
American football offensive tackles
Georgia Bulldogs football players
Players of American football from Georgia (U.S. state)
Year of birth missing (living people)